The 4th Army Corps was an Army corps in the Imperial Russian Army.

Composition
30th Infantry Division
40th Infantry Division

Commanders
1879-1882: Mikhail Skobelev
1906-1908: Nikolai Kashtalinsky

Corps of the Russian Empire
Military units and formations established in 1877
Military units and formations disestablished in 1918
1877 establishments in the Russian Empire